I'm a Celebrity...Get Me Out of Here! returned for its fourteenth series on 16 November 2014 on ITV and ended on 7 December 2014.

The show was confirmed to be returning to ITV at the end of the previous series. On 22 October 2014, the trailer was revealed for the new series, which was broadcast on air across the ITV network in the run up to the series' premiere.

Ant & Dec both returned as presenters of the show, whilst Joe Swash, Laura Whitmore and Rob Beckett returned to present the ITV2 spin-off show, I'm a Celebrity...Get Me Out of Here! NOW!.

The series was won by Superbike champion Carl "Foggy" Fogarty, with Jake Quickenden and Melanie Sykes finishing in second and third places respectively.

Celebrities
The celebrity cast line-up for the fourteenth series was confirmed on 11 November 2014.

Results and elimination
 Indicates that the celebrity was immune from the vote
 Indicates that the celebrity received the most votes from the public
 Indicates that the celebrity received the fewest votes and was eliminated immediately (no bottom two)
 Indicates that the celebrity was named as being in the bottom two
 Indicates that the celebrity received the second fewest votes and were not named in the bottom two

Notes
 As part of the Terror Tombs challenge the winners of this would gain immunity from the first elimination. The Galahs (Edwina, Jake, Kendra, Michael, Nadia and Vicki) won this and immunity.
 The public were voting for who they wanted to win rather than to save.

Bushtucker trials
The contestants take part in daily trials to earn food. These trials aim to test both physical and mental abilities. The winner is usually determined by the number of stars collected during the trial, with each star representing a meal earned by the winning contestant for their camp mates. From 2014, the contestants can vote on iOS devices, as well as voting via phone.

 The public voted for who they wanted to face the trial
 The contestants decided who did which trial
 The trial was compulsory and neither the public nor celebrities decided who took part

Notes
 The "Rescue Squad" (Jimmy, Kendra, Melanie, Michael and Tinchy) had to select one of the camp mates from the Slammer (Craig, Foggy, Gemma, Nadia and Vicki) to free. They chose Foggy, however he was automatically selected to take part in the first trial of the series.
 The campmates from the Slammer were excluded from this trial.
 Gemma, who was a late arrival in Croc Creek, and the camp mates from the Slammer, were excluded from this trial.
 Jake and Edwina were excluded from this trial due to being new arrivals in the camp.
 Jake, Jimmy and Edwina were excluded from this trial due to being involved in the secret mission of the "CIA".
 Jake, Jimmy, Edwina and Kendra were excluded from this trial due to being involved in the "CIA".
 The celebrity with the second highest number of votes for the live trial was given the opportunity to take part in a bonus trial, with the chance to win drinks for the camp. Jimmy came second to Jake in the public vote and took part in the bonus trial.
 Jimmy and Foggy were chosen by the producers to take part in the overnight challenge to win stars for the celebrities. Jimmy and Foggy endured the trial for 3 hours (reduced due to the other camp mates sacrificing their luxury items and postcards) and in the morning a rescue team of Tinchy and Nadia had to locate the boys at their secret camp to guarantee the meals for camp. They were directed to their position by their camp mates in Snake Rock (previously the Celebrity Slammer), competing tasks such as locating bottles and opening chests with keys to gain co-ordinates. Ultimately the trial was ended when bad weather prevented the use of helicopters, but the celebrities were still awarded the full ten stars.
 Edwina was excluded from this trial on medical grounds.
 This trial between Jake (from the Galahs) against Foggy (from the Wombats) decided which tribe would be given a meal for every member before the final immunity challenge, Terror Tombs.
  This trial was originally attempted by Kendra, but it was decided for it to be re-attempted by Tinchy.

Star count

Dingo Dollar challenges
Members from camp will take part in the challenge to win 'Dingo Dollars'. If they win them then they can then take the dollars to the 'Outback Shack', where they can exchange them for camp luxuries with Kiosk Keith. Two options are given and the celebrities can choose which they would like to win. However, to win their luxury, a question is asked to the celebrities still in camp via the telephone box. If the question is answered correctly, the celebrities can take the items back to camp. If wrong, they receive nothing and Kiosk Keith will close the shack. The second and third challenges had a twist with them, and was sabotaged by members of the "Celebrity Intelligence Agency " (CIA).

 The celebrities got the question correct
 The celebrities got the question wrong

Ratings
Official ratings are taken from BARB. There were no shows on the 18 and 25 November due to live Champions League football being shown On ITV, but Get Me Out of Here! NOW! still aired as normal.

References

External links
 

Episode list using the default LineColor
2014 British television seasons
14